Gabulov is an Ossetian masculine surname, its feminine counterpart is Gabulova. It may refer to:

 Georgy Gabulov (born 1988), Russian football midfielder
 Vladimir Gabulov (born 1983), Russian football goalkeeper

Russian-language surnames